Epicausis smithiiis a species of moth of the family Noctuidae. It is found in  Madagascar.

It has a wingspan of about 55–62 mm. The thorax is dark red, the abdomen black, the forewings are orange yellow with a broad black costa.

References

External links
Type species: British Natural History Museum

Owlet moths of Africa
Moths of Madagascar
Moths described in 1880
Moths of Africa